Sydney City was an electoral district for the Legislative Assembly in the Australian state of New South Wales from 1856 to 1859, when it was split into the electorates of East Sydney and West Sydney.

Members for Sydney City

Election results

References

Sydney City
1856 establishments in Australia
1859 disestablishments in Australia